José Adauto Bezerra (3 July 1926 – 3 April 2021) was a Brazilian politician. He was Governor of Ceará from 1975 to 1978, a member of the Legislative Assembly of Ceará from 1959 to 1979, and a national deputy from 1979 to 1983.

Biography
He died of complications related to COVID-19 in Fortaleza.

References

1926 births
2021 deaths
Deaths from the COVID-19 pandemic in Ceará
National Democratic Union (Brazil) politicians
Progressistas politicians
Members of the Chamber of Deputies (Brazil) from Ceará
National Renewal Alliance politicians
20th-century Brazilian politicians
Members of the Legislative Assembly of Ceará
Governors of Ceará
Democrats (Brazil) politicians
Democratic Social Party politicians